Djanet is an oasis city, and capital of Djanet District as well as of Djanet Province, southeast Algeria. According to the 2008 census it has a population of 14,655, up from 9,699 in 1998, and an annual population growth rate of 4.3%. It is inhabited by the Kel Ajjer Tuareg people.

History
The region of Djanet has been inhabited since Neolithic times.  There were periods of ten thousand years at a time that the area was not desert.  The flora and fauna were luxuriant as is seen in the numerous rock paintings of Tassili n'Ajjer around Djanet.  Populations of hunter-gatherers lived there.

Djanet was founded in the Middle Ages by the Tuareg. The Ottoman Empire, which had a nominal authority over the Fezzan region, reinforced their presence in the area at the beginning of the 20th century in reaction to the colonization of Africa by the Europeans.

Geography
Djanet, and the nearby towns of Azelouaz, El Mihan, Adjahil and Eferi, lie in a valley carved by the intermittent river (wadi) Oued Idjeriou through the southwest edge of the Tassili n'Ajjer mountain range and east of the Erg Admer sand dunes. The Tadrart Rouge is located to the southeast and is a southern prolongation of the Libyan Tadrart Acacus.

Due to the somewhat cooler air, higher humidity and somewhat higher rainfall in these areas, the nearby mountains support a greater amount and variety of wildlife than lower-lying areas in the Sahara, and forms part of the West Saharan montane xeric woodlands ecosystem.

Climate
Djanet has a hot desert climate (Köppen climate classification BWh), with very hot summers and mild winters.

Transport
Djanet Inedbirene Airport is located about 30 kilometers south of the city center.

Education
4.1% of the population has a tertiary education, and another 19.8% has completed secondary education. The overall literacy rate is 85.6%, and is 92.1% among males and 78.0% among females, all three rates being the highest for any commune in the province.

Localities
The commune is composed of 12 localities:

Centre Ville
Azelouaz
Tin Katma
El Mihan
Aghoum
Adjahil
Eferi
In Abarbar
Medak
Arikin
Tin El Koum
Anijir

See also 

 Sebiba

External links

References

Neighbouring towns and cities

Oases of Algeria
Djanet District
Tuareg
Communes of Illizi Province
Illizi Province